Lake Monroe is one of the lakes that make up the St. Johns River system. The port city of Sanford is situated along the southern shore, while DeBary and Deltona are located along the northern shore. Two major central Florida roadways that run near the lake are State Road 415 and Interstate 4. It forms the border of Seminole County and Volusia County It is the 8th largest lake in the Orlando metropolitan area, after Lake Jesup, 7 miles (11 km) to the south.

See also
Green Springs Park
List of lakes of the St. Johns River
St. Johns River

References

External links
 

Monroe
Monroe
Monroe
St. Johns River